Liga Deportiva del Amambay initialed LDA is the department governing body for association football in the Amambay Department in Paraguay. It is affiliated with the Asociación Paraguaya de Fútbol, the sport's national governing body.

The LDA was founded on 25 May 1953 during which only four clubs existed: Sportivo 2 de Mayo, Aquidabán, Independiente Fútbol Club and Sportivo Obrero.

Liga Deportiva del Amambay's league is the Paraguayan Cuarta Division in the Paraguayan football league system, where which the top clubs qualify for the Primera División B Nacional, Paraguay's third division.

Clubs
 América Foot Ball Club
 Club Aquidabán
 Club Atlético Bernardino Caballero  
 Atlético Pedro Juan Caballero  
 Club Deportivo 1º de Marzo 
 General Diaz Foot Ball Club  
 Club Sportivo 2 de Mayo 
 Club Sportivo Obrero  
 Independiente Fútbol Club  
 Mariscal Estigarribia Fútbol Club

References

External links
 Fútbol Paraguay

Football clubs in Paraguay
1953 establishments in Paraguay